Framhaldsskólinn í Austur-Skaftafellssýslu (often abbreviated FAS) is a secondary school located in Höfn, southeast Iceland.  It was founded in 1987 by the Icelandic government and municipalities in Austur-Skaftafellssýsla.  The first 15 years, it was located in Nesjaskóli, in Nes, a nearby rural area, but was moved to a new building, Nýheimar, in 2002.  The school has about 200 students, mostly locals, but distance education is also quite common.  Current principal is Eyjólfur Guðmundsson.

References

External links
 Official website
 Student body

Gymnasiums in Iceland
Education in Iceland
Educational institutions established in the 20th century
Educational institutions established in 1987
1987 establishments in Iceland